The Ministry of tourism is a ministry in Government of Maharashtra. Ministry is responsible for promotion of travel and tourism in Maharashtra.

Ministry is headed by Cabinet level Minister. Mangal Lodha is current Minister of Tourism since 14 August 2022.

Tourism in Maharashtra
Maharashtra attracts tourists from different states and foreign countries. It was the second most visited Indian state by foreigners and fourth most visited state by domestic tourists in the country in 2014. Aurangabad is the tourism capital of Maharashtra.

Head office

List of Cabinet Ministers

List of Ministers of State

List of Principal Secretary
Mr. Valsa Nair Singh IAS

MTDC

Ministry has separate wing which looks after tourism development. Maharashtra Tourism Development Corporation commonly abbreviated as MTDC, is a body of the Ministry of Tourism responsible for development of tourism in the Indian state of Maharashtra. It has been established under the Companies Act, 1956, (fully owned by Govt. of Maharashtra) for systematic development of tourism on commercial lines, with an authorized share capital of Rs. 25 crore. The paid up share capital of the corporation as on 31 March 2013 is Rs. 1538.88 lakhs.

See All Ministry 
Ministry of General Administration (Maharashtra)
Ministry of Information and Public Relations (Maharashtra)
Ministry of Information Technology (Maharashtra)
Ministry of Law and Judiciary (Maharashtra)
Ministry of Home Affairs (Maharashtra)
Ministry of Public Works (Excluding Public Undertakings) (Maharashtra)
Ministry of Public Works (Including Public Undertakings) (Maharashtra)
Ministry of Finance (Maharashtra)
Ministry of Planning (Maharashtra)
Ministry of Revenue (Maharashtra)
Ministry of State Excise (Maharashtra)
Ministry of Special Assistance (Maharashtra)
Ministry of Social Justice (Maharashtra)
Ministry of Forests Department (Maharashtra)
Ministry of Environment and Climate Change (Maharashtra)
Ministry of Energy (Maharashtra)
Ministry of Water Resources (Maharashtra)
Ministry of Command Area Development (Maharashtra)
Ministry of Public Health (Maharashtra)
Ministry of Housing (Maharashtra)
Ministry of Urban Development (Maharashtra)
Ministry of Rural Development (Maharashtra)
Ministry of Labour (Maharashtra)
Ministry of Co-operation (Maharashtra)
Ministry of Marketing (Maharashtra)
Ministry of Transport (Maharashtra)
Ministry of Industries (Maharashtra)
Ministry of Mining Department (Maharashtra)
Ministry of Textiles (Maharashtra)
Ministry of Protocol (Maharashtra)
Ministry of Tourism (Maharashtra)
Ministry of Cultural Affairs (Maharashtra)
Ministry of Marathi Language (Maharashtra)
Ministry of Water Supply (Maharashtra)
Ministry of Soil and Water Conservation (Maharashtra)
Ministry of Parliamentary Affairs (Maharashtra)
Ministry of Sanitation (Maharashtra)
Ministry of Woman and Child Development (Maharashtra)
Ministry of School Education (Maharashtra)
Ministry of Medical Education (Maharashtra)
Ministry of Higher and Technical Education (Maharashtra)
Ministry of Skill Development and Entrepreneurship (Maharashtra)
Ministry of Sports and Youth Welfare (Maharashtra)
Ministry of Ex. Servicemen Welfare (Maharashtra)
Ministry of Agriculture (Maharashtra)
Ministry of Food, Civil Supplies and Consumer Protection (Maharashtra)
Ministry of Food and Drug Administration (Maharashtra)
Ministry of Animal Husbandry Department (Maharashtra)
Ministry of Dairy Development (Maharashtra)
Ministry of Horticulture (Maharashtra)
Ministry of Fisheries Department (Maharashtra)
Ministry of Ports Development (Maharashtra)
Ministry of Disaster Management (Maharashtra)
Ministry of Relief & Rehabilitation (Maharashtra)
Ministry of Khar Land Development (Maharashtra)
Ministry of Earthquake Rehabilitation (Maharashtra)
Ministry of Employment Guarantee (Maharashtra)
Ministry of Minority Development and Aukaf (Maharashtra)
Ministry of Majority Welfare Development (Maharashtra)
Ministry of Tribal Development (Maharashtra)
Ministry of Vimukta Jati (Maharashtra)
Ministry of Nomadic Tribes (Maharashtra)
Ministry of Other Backward Classes (Maharashtra)
Ministry of Other Backward Bahujan Welfare (Maharashtra)
Ministry of Special Backward Classes Welfare (Maharashtra)
Ministry of Socially and Educationally Backward Classes (Maharashtra)

References

External links

 
Maharashtra
Maharashtra-related lists
Subnational tourism ministries